Puzur-Ashur III was the king of Assyria from  1521 BC to 1498 BC. According to the Assyrian King List, he was the son and successor of Ashur-nirari I and ruled for 24 years (or 14 years, according to another copy). He is also the first Assyrian king to appear in the synchronistic history, where he is described as a contemporary of Burnaburiash of Babylon. A few of his building inscriptions were found at Assur. He rebuilt part of the temple of Ishtar in his capital, Ashur, and the southern parts of the city wall.

References 

16th-century BC births
16th-century BC Assyrian kings
15th-century BC Assyrian kings

Year of birth unknown
Year of death unknown